Milan Michálek (born 7 December 1984) is a Czech former professional ice hockey left winger who most recently played under contract to the Toronto Maple Leafs of the National Hockey League (NHL). He was drafted sixth overall by the San Jose Sharks in the 2003 NHL Entry Draft.

His older brother is Zbyněk Michálek, a defenceman who last played in the NHL within the Arizona Coyotes organization.

Playing career

Michálek scored a goal in his first NHL game before suffering a serious knee injury the next game, on 11 October 2003, tearing his right ACL. After knee surgery, Michálek played in the American Hockey League (AHL) before injuring his knee again on 22 January. During the 2004–05 NHL lockout, Michálek did not play anywhere, spending the time rehabilitating his knee.

Michálek played his first full season with the Sharks in 2005–06, scoring 17 goals and 35 points and earning the San Jose Sharks' PlayStation Rookie of the Year award. In the 2006–07 season, Michálek emerged as a speedy, multidimensional player and an offensive threat, scoring 26 goals and 66 points. During the following offseason, Michálek signed a six-year, $26 million contract extension through 2014 while still having one year left on his original rookie contract. It was the longest and most lucrative contract ever signed by a Sharks player. In 2007–08, Michálek played primarily on the Sharks' top line with Joe Thornton. Michálek's production dipped to 24 goals and 55 points, but due to the Sharks' overall offensive struggles, he was still second on the team to Thornton in goals and points.

On 12 September 2009, Michálek was traded by the Sharks along with Jonathan Cheechoo and a second round pick in 2010 to the Ottawa Senators in exchange for forward Dany Heatley and a fifth round draft pick in 2010.

With the Senators, Michálek scored his first career NHL hat-trick against the Tampa Bay Lightning on 15 October 2009; two shorthanded and one on the powerplay. On 1 December, he scored two goals against his former team in a 5–2 loss in San Jose.

Michálek suffered a concussion after colliding with teammate Erik Karlsson on 13 December 2011, causing him to miss five games. At the time of the injury, he was leading the NHL in goals with 19. He was later selected in fan balloting as a starter in the 2012 NHL All-Star Game and finished the season with a career high 35 goals.

Whilst injured during the 2015–16 season, Michálek was dealt to the Toronto Maple Leafs on 9 February 2016, in a blockbuster nine-player trade focusing around Dion Phaneuf heading to Ottawa.

International play
Michálek played on the 2010 Czech Republic Olympic hockey team along with his brother. He played in five games and scored two goals in those Olympics. The two brothers also played for the Czech team which finished sixth in the 2014 Olympics.

Career statistics

Regular season and playoffs

International

See also 
 Notable families in the NHL

References

External links 
 

1984 births
Living people
Motor České Budějovice players
Cleveland Barons (2001–2006) players
Czech expatriate ice hockey players in Canada
Czech expatriate ice hockey players in the United States
Czech ice hockey left wingers
Ice hockey players at the 2010 Winter Olympics
Ice hockey players at the 2014 Winter Olympics
National Hockey League first-round draft picks
National Hockey League All-Stars
Olympic ice hockey players of the Czech Republic
Ottawa Senators players
People from Jindřichův Hradec
San Jose Sharks draft picks
San Jose Sharks players
Toronto Maple Leafs players
Toronto Marlies players
Sportspeople from the South Bohemian Region